Heiltz-l'Évêque is a commune in the Marne department in north-eastern France.

Geography
The Chée flows west-southwestward through the middle of the commune and forms part of its south-western border.

See also
Communes of the Marne department

References

Heiltzleveque